Deh Abuzar (also Romanized as Deh Ābūẕar) is a village in Mashiz Rural District, in the Central District of Bardsir County, Kerman Province, Iran. At the 2006 census, its population was 44, in 13 families.

References 

Populated places in Bardsir County